Torske may refer to:

Places
 , a settlement in Druzhkivka hromada, Kramatorsk Raion (formerly Kostiantynivka Raion), Donetsk Oblast, eastern Ukraine
 Torske, a village in Lyman hromada, Kramatorsk Raion, Donetsk Oblast, eastern Ukraine
 , a settlement in Chortkiv Raion, Ternopil Oblast, western Ukraine

People
 Bjørn Torske (born 1971), Norwegian music producer
 Jarl Torske (born 1949), Norwegian footballer
 Tor Erik Torske (born 1983), Norwegian footballer

See also